The 1983 Supercopa de España was two-leg Spanish football matches played on 26 October and 30 November 1983. It contested by Barcelona, winners of the 1982–83 Copa del Rey, and Athletic Bilbao, winners of the 1982–83 La Liga.

Match details

First leg

Second leg

See also
Athletic–Barcelona clásico

References
 linguasport.com

Supercopa de Espana Final
Supercopa de Espana 1983
Supercopa de Espana 1983
Supercopa de España